Oxford Township is one of seven townships in Johnson County, Kansas, USA.  As of the 2010 census, its population was 2,020.

Adjacent Townships

 Olathe Township West

Cemeteries
Aubry Cemetery

Emergency Services

Police
 Johnson County Sheriff
 Overland Park Police
 Olathe Police

Fire
 Johnson County Rural Fire Department
 Overland Park Fire
 Olathe Fire

Medical (EMS)
 Olathe Medical Center
 Shawnee Mission Medical Center
 Overland Park Regional Medical Center
 Miami County Medical Center

Transportation

Major highways

School districts
 Blue Valley School District

External links

Townships in Johnson County, Kansas
Townships in Kansas